Congenital dyserythropoietic anemia (CDA) is a rare blood disorder, similar to the thalassemias. CDA is one of many types of anemia, characterized by ineffective erythropoiesis, and resulting from a decrease in the number of red blood cells (RBCs) in the body and a less than normal quantity of hemoglobin in the blood. CDA may be transmitted by both parents autosomal recessively or dominantly.

Signs and symptoms
The symptoms and signs of congenital dyserythropoietic anemia are consistent with:
 Tiredness (fatigue)
 Weakness
 Pale skin

Types
Congenital dyserythropoietic anemia has four different subtypes, CDA Type I, CDA Type II, CDA Type III, and CDA Type IV. CDA type II (CDA II) is the most frequent type of congenital dyserythropoietic anemias.

Diagnosis
The diagnosis of congenital dyserythropoietic anemia can be done via sequence analysis of the entire coding region, types I, II, III and IV ( is a relatively new form of CDA that had been found, just 4 cases have been reported) according to the genetic testing registry.

Treatment

Treatment of individuals with CDA usually consist of frequent blood transfusions, but this can vary depending on the type that the individual has.  Patients report going every 2–3 weeks for blood transfusions. In addition, they must undertake chelation therapy to survive; either deferoxamine, deferasirox, or deferiprone to eliminate the excess iron that accumulates. Removal of the spleen and gallbladder are common. Hemoglobin levels can run anywhere between 8.0 g/dl and 11.0 g/dl in untransfused patients, the amount of blood received by the patient is not as important as their baseline pre-transfusion hemoglobin level. This is true for ferritin levels and iron levels in the organs as well, it is important for patients to go regularly for transfusions in order to maximize good health, normal ferritin levels run anywhere between 24 and 336 ng/ml, hematologists generally do not begin chelation therapy until ferritin levels reach at least 1000 ng/ml. It is more important to check iron levels in the organs through MRI scans, however, than to simply get regular blood tests to check ferritin levels, which only show a trend, and do not reflect actual organ iron content.

Gene therapy
Gene therapy, as well as, bone marrow transplant are also possible treatments for the disorder, but each have their own risks at this point in time. Bone marrow transplantation is the more used method between the two, whereas researchers are still trying to definitively establish the results of gene therapy treatment. It generally requires a 10/10 HLA matched donor, however, who is usually a sibling. As most patients do not have this, they must rely on gene therapy research to potentially provide them with an alternative. CDA at both clinical and genetic aspects are part of a heterogeneous group of genetic conditions. Gene therapy is still experimental and has largely only been tested in animal models until now. This type of therapy has promise, however, as it allows for the autologous transplantation of the patient's own healthy stem cells rather than requiring an outside donor, thereby bypassing any potential for graft vs. host disease (GVHD).

In the United States, the FDA approved clinical trials on Beta thalassemia patients in 2012. The first study, which took place in July 2012, recruited human subjects with thalassemia major,

See also
 Thalassemia
 Hemoglobinopathy
 List of hematologic conditions

References

Further reading

External links 

Genetic disorders with no OMIM
Red blood cell disorders
Anemias